Binani Cement Limited is engaged in the production and sales of cement and clinker based in Mumbai, Maharashtra, India. It is the flagship subsidiary of Binani Industries Ltd. The company is certified as ISO9001, ISO14001 and OHSAS18001 compliant. The company's subsidiaries include Krishna Holdings Pte Limited, Muku, Dubai (BCFLLC).

History
The company was incorporated on 15 January 1996 as Dynasty Dealer Private Ltd. In 1998, it was listed on BSE and changed its name to Binani Cement Ltd.

References

Cement companies of India
Manufacturing companies based in Mumbai
Companies established in 1996
1996 establishments in Maharashtra
Manufacturing companies established in 1996
Indian companies established in 1996
Companies listed on the Bombay Stock Exchange